The 2004 CONCACAF Men's Pre-Olympic Tournament was an international football tournament that was held in Mexico from 2 to 10 February 2004. The eight national teams involved in the tournament were required to register a squad of twenty players, three of whom had to be goalkeepers.

The final lists were published by CONCACAF on 1 February 2004.

The age listed for each player is on 2 February 2004, the first day of the tournament. A flag is included for coaches who are of a different nationality than their own national team. Players marked in bold have been capped at full international level.

Group A

Canada
Coach: Bruce Twanley

Honduras
Coach: Edwin Pavón

Panama
Coach:  José Hernández

United States
Coach: Glenn Myernick

Group B

Costa Rica
Coach: Rodrigo Kenton

Jamaica
Coach: Peter Cargill

Mexico
Coach:  Ricardo La Volpe

Trinidad and Tobago
Coach:  Stuart Charles-Fevrier

References

External links

Squads, 2004 Concacaf Mens Pre-olympic Tournament
2004 in CONCACAF football